The Anthem of Curaçao is the national anthem of Curaçao. Officially adopted on 26 July 1978, it consists of four verses, although only the first and last are commonly sung. Its theme is best summed up by the first stanza, praising the grandeur of Curaçao, as small as the island may be.

History
The lyrics were first written by a friar of Dutch origin, Friar Radulphus, in celebration of the coronation of Queen Wilhelmina in 1898. The song was known as "" ("In Every Nation Our Fatherland Is Little Known"). During the celebrations, the pupils of a local elementary school, the St. Jozefschool, sang this to the melody of the Tyrolean hymn "".

It wasn't until the 1930s when Friar Candidus Nouwens composed the melody to which the anthem is sung today. For many years since, the song was sung on the Dutch national holiday Koninginnedag (or Queen's Day), and on other official occasions. In 1978, the government commissioned a group to rewrite the lyrics before it would be adopted as the official anthem of Curaçao on 26 July. The assumed belittlement of the Island by the title and the first phrase was one of the motives for the adaptation ordered by the insular government. The website of the insular government of Curaçao cites Guillermo Rosario, Mae Henriquez, Enrique Muller and Betty Doran as the writers of the anthem's lyrics.

Performance
On June 18, 2003, the insular government of Curaçao defined regulations on the official use of the anthem. Typically, only the first and last verses are sung. The only occasions where all four are officially sung are:

 When the administrator, a deputy or a member of the insular government starts their tenure,
 At meetings organised by the insular government to celebrate an official holiday or an official commemoration of an event and,
 When raising the flag at official events organised for the insular government.

As for all television and radio broadcasts, the anthem is played at midnight on New Year's and every day at the beginning and end of transmission. Various radio stations on the island play the anthem at noon as well. The anthem may only be sung in Papiamentu.

Lyrics 
Typically, only the first and last verses are sung.

Notes

References

Bibliography 
 

North American anthems
National symbols of Curaçao
Dutch anthems
National anthems